Graham County Courthouse may refer to:

 Graham County Courthouse (Arizona), Safford, Arizona
 Graham County Courthouse (Kansas), Hill City, Kansas
 Graham County Courthouse (North Carolina), Robbinsville, North Carolina